Muzzle energy is the kinetic energy of a bullet as it is expelled from the muzzle of a firearm. Without consideration of factors such as aerodynamics and gravity for the sake of comparison, muzzle energy is used as a rough indication of the destructive potential of a given firearm or cartridge.  The heavier the bullet and especially the faster it moves, the higher its muzzle energy and the more damage it will do.

Kinetic energy

The general formula for the kinetic energy is

where
v is the velocity of the bullet
m is the mass of the bullet.

Although both mass and velocity contribute to the muzzle energy, the muzzle energy is proportional to the mass while proportional to the square of the velocity. The velocity of the bullet is a more important determinant of muzzle energy. For a constant velocity, if the mass is doubled, the energy is doubled; however, for a constant mass, if the velocity is doubled, the muzzle energy increases four times. In the SI system the above Ek will be in unit joule if the mass, m, is in kilogram, and the speed, v, is in metre per second.

Typical muzzle energies of common firearms and cartridges

Muzzle energy is dependent upon the factors previously listed, and velocity is highly variable depending upon the length of the barrel a projectile is fired from. Also the muzzle energy is only an upper limit for how much energy is transmitted to the target, and the effects of a ballistic trauma depend on several other factors as well. There is wide variation in commercial ammunition. A  bullet fired from the same gun might only achieve  of muzzle energy, depending upon the manufacture of the cartridge. Some .45 Colt ammunition can produce  of muzzle energy.

Legal requirements on muzzle energy

Many parts of the world use muzzle energy to classify guns into categories that require different categories of licence. In general guns that have the potential to be more dangerous have tighter controls, while those of minimal energy, such as small air pistols or air rifles, require little more than user registration, or in some countries have no restrictions at all. Overview of gun laws by nation indicates the various approaches taken. Firearms regulation in the United Kingdom is a complicated example, but is demarked by muzzle energy as well as barrel length and ammunition diameter.

Some jurisdictions also stipulate minimum muzzle energies for safe hunting. For example, in Denmark rifle ammunition used for hunting the largest types of game there such as red deer must have a kinetic energy E100 (i.e.: at 100 m range) of at least 2700 J and a bullet mass of at least 9 g or alternatively an E100 of at least 2000 J and a bullet mass of at least 10 g. Namibia specifies three levels of minimum muzzle energy for hunting, 1350 J for game such as springbok, 2700 J for game such as hartebeest and 5400 J for big game, together with a minimum caliber of 7 mm.

In Germany airsoft guns with a muzzle energy of no more than 0.5 J are exempt from the gun law, while air guns with a muzzle energy of no more than 7.5 J may be acquired without a firearms license.

Mainland China uses a varied concept of "muzzle ratio kinetic energy", which is the quotient (ratio) of the muzzle energy divided by the bore cross sectional area, to distinguish genuine guns from "imitation" replicas like toy guns. The Ministry of Public Security unilaterally introduced the concept in 2008 leading up to the Beijing Olympic Games, dictating that anything over 1.8 J/cm2 to be defined as real firearms. For comparison a standard baseball changeup thrown at  has 1.951 J/cm2 of "ratio energy" which also exceeds the 1.8 J/cm2 level of a real firearm while a fastball can reach over 3.5 J/cm2 or nearly double the level of a real firearm. The subsequent crackdowns by local law enforcement led to many seizures, arrests and prosecutions of individual owners for "trafficking and possession of illegal weapons" over the years for weapons that were previously permitted.

See also
Free recoil
Muzzle velocity
Power factor (shooting sports)

Resources
Edward F. Obert, Thermodynamics, McGraw-Hill Book Co., 1948.
Mc Graw-Hill encyclopedia of Science and Technology, volume ebe-eye and ice-lev, 9th Edition, Mc Graw-Hill, 2002.

References

Ammunition
Ballistics